Tan Kok Wai (born 7 October 1957) is a Malaysian politician who served as Special Envoy to the Prime Minister to China in the Pakatan Harapan (PH) administration under former Prime Minister Mahathir Mohamad from August 2018 to March 2020. He has served as the Member of Parliament (MP) for Cheras since April 1995 and for Sungai Besi from August 1986 to April 1995. He is a member of the Democratic Action Party (DAP), a component party of the PH coalition. He has served as the Advisor of DAP since March 2022, National Chairman of DAP from March 2014 to March 2022 and Chairman of PH of Kuala Lumpur since August 2017. He is presently also the longest-serving MP by serving since 1986 for 37 years as of 2023 after Tengku Razaleigh Hamzah failed to be reelected as an MP in 2022.

Current Designations 

 Adivisor, Democratic Action Party (DAP) Malaysia
 Chairman of DAP State Committee for Federal Territory Kuala Lumpur
 Pakatan Harapan State Chairman for Federal Territory Kuala Lumpur
 8 terms Member of Parliament from 1986. Currently serving the Cheras parliamentary constituency, Kuala Lumpur.

Political career 
Tan Kok Wai became a member of the party in 1979.

In 1986, he contested in the general election for Sungai Besi parliamentary constested in the general election for Sungai Besi parliamentary constituency in Kuala Lumpur. He was elected as a member of parliament for the first time. 

In 1990, he was re-elected for the same constituency in the general election. 

In the 6 following general elections in 1995, 1999, 2004, 2008, 2013 and 2018, Tan Kok Wai was elected as the Member of Parliament for Cheras constituency in Kuala Lumpur.

Tan Kok Wai was the former DAP National Chairman (Nov 2017 – March 2022). Previously, he also served as DAP’s Acting National Chairman, National Deputy Chairman, National Vice Chairman, Chairman of the Election Preparation Committee, Member of General Election / State Elections Candidate Selection Committee in 2008, 2013 and 2018, Chairman of the Disciplinary Committee, National Organising Secretary, and National Publicity Secretary, Assistant National Organising Secretary and Assistant National Publicity Secretary. 

Tan Kok Wai was appointed Special Envoy of Malaysia to the People's Republic of China as well as the Chairman of Malaysia-China Business Council from August 2018 to March 2020.

In terms of social service, he is currently acting as honorary advisors to numerous NGOs in Federal Territory Kuala Lumpur and Selangor.

Appointment as the Advisor of DAP 
On 20 March 2022, at the 17th DAP National Congress, Tan was re-elected into the Central Executive Committee. He was then appointed as Advisor of DAP Malaysia after stepping down as the National Chairman.

Election results

See also
Cheras (federal constituency)

References

1957 births
Living people
People from Negeri Sembilan
Malaysian politicians of Chinese descent
Democratic Action Party (Malaysia) politicians
Members of the Dewan Rakyat
20th-century Malaysian politicians
21st-century Malaysian politicians